The 1941 All-Pro Team consisted of American football players chosen by various selectors for the All-Pro team of the National Football League (NFL) for the 1941 NFL season. Teams were selected by, among others, the so-called "official" All-Pro team selected by a committee of professional football writers for the NFL (NFL), the sports writers of the Associated Press (AP), the United Press (UP), Collyer's Eye (CE), the New York Daily News (NYDN), and the Chicago Herald American.

Players displayed in bold were consensus first-team selections. Five players were named to the first team by all six selectors: Green Bay Packers halfback Cecil Isbell; Chicago Bears halfback George McAfee; Green Bay Packers end Don Hutson; Chicago Bears guard Dan Fortmann; and Chicago Bears center Bulldog Turner.

References

All-Pro Teams
1941 National Football League season